Yi Ji (Hangul: 이지, Hanja: 李祬; 31 December 1598 - 22 July 1623), or firstly named Yi Su (Hangul: 이수, Hanja: 李修) and sometimes spelled as Yi Jil (Hangul: 이질, Hanja: 李祬), was a Korean Crown Prince as the second son (formally as first son) of Gwanghaegun of Joseon and Deposed Queen Yu of the Munhwa Yu clan. He later was deposed from his position along with his father's abdication and then become deposed crown prince (폐세자, 廢世子) in 1608.

Biography

Early life
The future Crown Prince was born on 31 December 1598 as the second son (formally as oldest son because his older brother died suddenly after birth) of the then Crown Prince Gwanghae and Crown Princess Munseong of the Munhwa Yu clan. Then, on 2 February 1608, he was appointed as an Heir Successor to the throne or Prince Royal (원자, 元子), then, on 21 March in the same year, he was promoted and become a Crown Prince (왕세자, 王世子).

As Crown Prince
On 4 May, there was a selection to be his primary wife, the Crown Princess Consort (세자빈 간택). Then, the chosen was reported on 27 July 1611 and Park Ja-heung's 13-year-old daughter, Lady Park, became the crown princess consort. On 2 August, they were married. From this marriage, a daughter was born in the summer of 1614, but died that same year in the winter. 

With an unnamed concubine, Yi Jil had a second daughter, Yi Ah-gi (이아기, 李娥其), in 1618 who was the only surviving child of the crown prince.

Then when he was 21 years old on 13 May 1618, he was looking a woman to be So-hun (rank junior 5 for Crown Prince's concubine; 소훈, 昭訓) and the chosen was Heo Gyun's daughter and Heo Nanseolheon’s niece, Lady Heo. There was no issue within the relationship.

Later life
Later, on 14 March 1623, when he was 25 years old, Yi ji was deposed from his position as Crown Prince, along with his family and his wife, and was exiled to Ganghwa Island on 23 March. While in exile, the deposed couple fasted or tried to commit suicide by hanging themselves, but failed. In the end, about two months later in April (May of the lunar calendar), Yi Ji was digging a tunnel to escape.

When his wife and him tried to escape the island, they were caught by the royal soldiers. His wife committed suicide in June 1623 (lunar calendar May) the third day after her husband was arrested. Then on 22 July, a month after his late wife’s death (in Lunar calendar was 25 June), he died from hunger.

Family
Father: Gwanghaegun of Joseon (4 June 1575 - 7 August 1641) (조선 광해군)
Grandfather: Seonjo of Joseon (26 November 1552 - 16 March 1608) (조선 선조왕)
Grandmother: Royal Noble Consort Gong of the Gimhae Kim clan (16 November 1553 - 13 June 1577) (공빈 김씨)
Mother: Deposed Queen Yu of the Munhwa Yu clan (15 August 1576 - 31 October 1623) (폐비 유씨)
Grandfather: Yu Ja-Sin, Internal Prince Munyang (December 1541 - 7 February 1612) (유자신 문양부원군) 
Grandmother: Internal Princess Consort Bongwon of the Dongrae Jeong clan (1541 - 1620) (봉원부부인 동래 정씨)
Consorts and their Respective Issue(s):
Deposed Crown Princess Park of the Miryang Park clan (1598 - June 1623) (폐빈 밀양 박씨)
Unnamed princess (군주) (1614 - 1614)
Unnamed concubine 
Princess Yi Ah-gi (1618 - ?) (현주 이아기)
Royal Consort So-hun of the Yangcheon Heo clan (소훈 양천 허씨) – No issue.

In popular culture
Portrayed by Jung Tae-woo in the 2003 SBS TV series The King's Woman.
Portrayed by Choi Seung-hun in the 2014 KBS2 TV series The King's Face.
Portrayed by Lee Ha-yool in the 2015 MBC TV series Splendid Politics.

References

1598 births
1623 deaths
17th-century Korean people
Korean princes
House of Yi
Heirs apparent who never acceded